The Shreveport Tigers were a minor-league baseball team based in Shreveport, Louisiana. The team played during the 1899 season in the Southern League.

The Negro league Shreveport Tigers played in the Negro Texas League.

References

 
Tigers
Baseball teams established in 1899
Professional baseball teams in Louisiana
Defunct baseball teams in Louisiana
Negro league baseball teams
Baseball teams disestablished in 1899